George M. Campbell (January 7, 1907 – June 4, 1942) was a United States Navy officer.  He was killed in action at the Battle of Midway while flying a torpedo bomber during an attack against several Japanese aircraft carriers.

Early life
Campbell was born on January 7, 1907, in Madras, Oregon. He was the ninth of a dozen children in his family.  His father was a dairy farmer who also piloted a ferry across the Deschutes River.  He attended a one room schoolhouse.  He excelled at basketball in high school, and was part of a team that won a state championship in 1925.

He attended Oregon State University.

Naval career

On June 27, 1928, he enlisted in the U.S. Navy. He did flight training in Pensacola, Florida, and received his wings in 1930. While in that training, he met and married Genevieve Thompson, by whom he had a daughter, Shirley, born in 1932.

He served as a flight instructor beginning in 1938.  At the dawn of the Japanese Attack on Pearl Harbor, he had become one of the Navy's most experienced pilots. "John Waldron relied on him as a teacher and mentor to the younger pilots." He was promoted to Lieutenant (junior grade) in February, 1942.

In 1942 Campbell underwent more flight training and was appointed Lieutenant, junior grade, on April 2, 1942.

He joined Torpedo Squadron 8 on board the aircraft carrier USS Hornet (CV-8) just in time to take part in the Battle of Midway.

VT-8's first and best-known combat mission came during the Battle of Midway on 4 June 1942. Flying obsolete Douglas TBD Devastators, all of Lieutenant Commander John C. Waldron's fifteen planes were shot down during their unescorted torpedo attack on Imperial Japanese Navy aircraft carriers. The squadron failed to damage any Japanese carriers or destroy enemy aircraft.

Only one member of VT-8 who flew from Hornet on that day survived in the action, Ensign George Gay.   Ensign Gay was rescued the day following the battle. Torpedo 8 was afterwards awarded the American Presidential Unit Citation.  As Ensign Gay tells it, the flight was chancy at best.  They had never performed an attack with torpedoes, and in fact had never even taken off from a carrier with torpedoes.  Their equipment was old, and the efficacy of their armament was questionable.  He thought that the absence of fighter cover may have made the difference.  Nevertheless, he thinks that the low level attack, which drew down the Japanese fighter air cover, opened up the skies for the successful attack by the dive bombers, and that this attack should be given that credit.  In passing, Gay has remarked that his sole survival, after being shot down, was just a matter of luck.

Piloting a Douglas TBD-1 Devastator torpedo bomber during the battle, Campbell took off with his squadron on June 4, 1942, to intercept the Japanese fleet, and without fighter cover attacked the enemy aircraft carriers against murderous opposition. Knowing full well that they had insufficient fuel to return to Hornet, the Torpedo Squadron 8 crews pressed their attack gallantly until all were shot down. Campbell was listed as presumed dead on June 5, 1942. Campbell was awarded the Navy Cross for his heroic actions at Midway.  He was killed in action during the attack.

All but one were lost. Six of the fourteen pilots were honored by appending their names to destroyers or destroyer escorts. Three AP/ex-APs were lost in action, namely piloted by: Jefferson D. Woodson, Robert B. Miles and George M. Campbell were lost in action.

Legacy
The U.S. Navy destroyer escort USS George M. Campbell (DE-773),  laid down by the Tampa Shipbuilding Company at Tampa, Florida, was launched in 1944 but never completed, was named for Campbell.  The construction contract was cancelled, and she was towed to Charleston, South Carolina.  Stripped for parts, she was scrapped.

Two short films deal with the men and the achievements of Torpedo Squadron 8 Midway.  Highlighting the 30 men in the Aircraft Carrier Hornet's torpedo squadron, director John Ford did an 8 minute long short documentary filmed during the Battle of Midway.

References

Citations

Bibliography

External links
George Marvin Campbell at Find a Grave

Recipients of the Navy Cross (United States)
United States Navy sailors
United States Navy officers
United States Navy personnel killed in World War II
1907 births
1942 deaths
People from Madras, Oregon
United States Navy pilots of World War II
Military personnel from Oregon